The 1942 Kansas Jayhawks football team represented the University of Kansas in the Big Six Conference during the 1942 college football season. In their fourth and final season under head coach Gwinn Henry, the Jayhawks compiled a 2–8 record (1–4 against conference opponents), tied for fifth place in the conference, and were outscored by opponents by a combined total of 248 to 77. They played their home games at Memorial Stadium in Lawrence, Kansas.

The team's statistical leaders included Ray Evans with 293 rushing yards and 1,117 passing yards, Otto Schnellbacher with 366 receiving yards, and Ed Lindquist with 24 points scored (four touchdowns). No team captain was elected in 1942. The members of the team would later become more well known for accomplishments other than their playing careers. Politician Bob Dole was an end on the team and businessman Bud Adams was a quarterback on the team.

Schedule

References

Kansas
Kansas Jayhawks football seasons
Kansas Jayhawks football